Pietro Orseolo may refer to:

Pietro I Orseolo (928–987), Doge of Venice from 976 to 978
Pietro II Orseolo, Doge of Venice from 991 to 1009
Peter Orseolo, King of Hungary (11th century)